Pinus sylvestris, the Scots pine (UK), Scotch pine (US) or Baltic pine, is a species of tree in the pine family Pinaceae that is native to Eurasia. It can readily be identified by its combination of fairly short, blue-green leaves and orange-red bark.

Description 

The lifespan is normally 150–300 years, with the oldest recorded specimens in Lapland, Northern Finland over 760 years.

The bark is thick, flaky and orange-red when young to scaly and gray-brown in maturity, sometimes retaining the former on the upper portion. The habit of the mature tree is distinctive due to its long, bare and straight trunk topped by a rounded or flat-topped mass of foliage.

The shoots are light brown, with a spirally arranged scale-like pattern. On vigorous young trees the leaves can be twice as long, and occasionally occur in fascicles of three or four on the tips of strong shoots. Leaf persistence varies from two to four years in warmer climates, and up to nine years in subarctic regions.

The cone scales have a flat to pyramidal apophysis (the external part of the cone scale), with a small prickle on the umbo (central boss or protuberance). The seeds are blackish,  in length with a pale brown  wing and are released when the cones open in spring 22–24 months after pollination.

Varieties 

Over 100 Pinus sylvestris varieties have been described in the botanical literature, but only three or four are now accepted. They differ only minimally in morphology, but with more pronounced differences in genetic analysis and resin composition. Populations in westernmost Scotland are genetically distinct from those in the rest of Scotland and northern Europe, but not sufficiently to have been distinguished as separate botanical varieties. Trees in the far north of the range were formerly sometimes treated as var. lapponica, but the differences are clinal and it is not genetically distinct.

Names 
Before the 18th century, the species was more often known as Scots fir or Scotch fir. Another, less common name is European redwood.

The timber from it is also called red deal or yellow deal, the name "deal" being adopted from an archaic unit of volume used to measure wood.

Distribution and habitat 

Pinus sylvestris is the only pine native to northern Europe, ranging from Western Europe to Eastern Siberia, south to the Caucasus Mountains and Anatolia, and north to well inside the Arctic Circle in Fennoscandia.

The species is mainly found on poorer, sandy soils, rocky outcrops, peat bogs or close to the forest limit. On fertile sites, the pine is out-competed by other tree species, usually spruce or broad-leaved trees.

Britain and Ireland 

The tree spread across Britain and Ireland after the Last Glacial Maximum. Pollen records show that pine was present locally in southern England by 9,000 years ago having entered from northeast France and that it had spread as far north as the Lake District and North Pennines 500 years later.

It was present in Ireland over 8,800 years ago but absent from Wales at that time which suggests that the pine in Ireland had a separate Iberian origin or contained surviving populations, although evidence towards its survival is lacking. Pine expanded into Scotland between 8,000 and 8,500 years ago either from an independent refuge, from Scandinavia (via Doggerland) or from Ireland. As the climate warmed it became extinct from most of Britain and Ireland around 5,500 years ago except in Scotland, Kielder in England and The Burren in County Clare, Ireland.

The Irish and western Scottish populations went through a massive decline around 4,000 years ago which ultimately led to the practical extinction of the Irish population between 2,000 and 1,000 years ago. It was replaced by large areas of blanket bog in western Scotland and Ireland though the reasons for its decline and extinction in England are not clear, but it may have been influenced by human activities.

In Britain it now occurs naturally only in Scotland. Historical and archaeological records indicate that it also occurred in Wales and England until about 300–400 years ago, becoming extinct there due to over-exploitation and grazing; it has been re-introduced in these countries. Similar historical extinction and re-introduction applies to Ireland, Denmark and the Netherlands. Whether it truly became extinct in England is unknown. It has been speculated that it may have survived wild long enough for trees used in cultivation in England to derive from native (rather than imported) sources. Shakespeare (in Richard II) was familiar with the species in the 1590s, as was Evelyn in the early 1660s (Sylva), both around the time when the pine was thought to become extinct in England, but when landowners were also beginning ornamental and forestry planting.

The pine formed much of the Caledonian Forest, which once covered much of the Scottish Highlands. Overcutting for timber demand, fire, overgrazing by sheep and deer, and even deliberate clearance to deter wolves have all been factors in the decline of this once great pine and birch forest. Only comparatively small areas, only just over 1% of the estimated original of this ancient forest remain, the main surviving remnants being at Abernethy Forest, Glen Affric, Rothiemurchus Forest, and the Black Wood of Rannoch. Plans are currently in progress to restore at least some areas and work has started at key sites.

Ecology 
It forms either pure forests or mixes with Norway spruce, common juniper, silver birch, European rowan, Eurasian aspen and other hardwood species. In central and southern Europe, it occurs with numerous additional species, including European black pine, mountain pine, Macedonian pine, and Swiss pine. In the eastern part of its range, it occurs with Siberian pine, among others.

In 2020, black spot needle blight was found on hundreds of Pinus sylvestris var. mongolica trees in four forest farms in northeastern China. It first appeared on the upper part of the needles, and then the needles became withered and gradually showed light black spots, although they still remained green. As the fungal disease progressed, the needles eventually died and turned gray with many dark black spots. The fungus was identified as Heterotruncatella spartii (within the family Sporocadaceae) based on morphology and molecular methods.

Uses 

Pinus sylvestris is an important tree in forestry. The wood is used for pulp and sawn timber products. A seedling stand can be created by planting, sowing, or natural regeneration. Commercial plantation rotations vary between 50 and 120 years, with longer rotations in northeastern areas where growth is slower.

In Scandinavian countries, the pine was used for making tar in the preindustrial age. Some active tar producers still exist, but that industry has almost ceased. The pine has also been used as a source of rosin and turpentine.

The wood is pale brown to red-brown, and used for general construction work. It has a dry density around 470 kg/m3 (varying with growth conditions), an open porosity of 60%, a fibre saturation point of 0.25 kg/kg, and a saturation moisture content of 1.60 kg/kg. The pine fibres are used to make the textile known as vegetable flannel, which has a hemp-like appearance, but with a tighter, softer texture.

The pine has also been widely planted in New Zealand and much of the colder regions of North America; it was one of the first trees introduced to North America, in about 1600. It is listed as an invasive species in some areas there, including Ontario, Michigan. It has been widely used in the United States for the Christmas tree trade, and was one of the most popular Christmas trees from the 1950s through the 1980s. It remains popular for that usage, though it has been eclipsed in popularity, by such species as Fraser fir, Douglas-fir, and others. Despite its invasiveness in parts of eastern North America, the pine does not often grow well there, partly due to climate and soil differences between its native habitat and that of North America, and partly due to damage by pests and diseases; the tree often grows in a twisted, haphazard manner if not tended to (as they are in the Christmas tree trade). The pines may be killed by the pine wood nematode, which causes pine wilt disease. The nematode most often attacks trees that are at least ten years old and often kills trees it infects within a few weeks.

The pine was grown and used extensively in the coal mining regions of Flanders, Belgium. It was used to fortify the tunnelling and preferred for its cracking sound when in need of replacing. Large patches of forest, mostly containing the species, are still scattered over the countryside.

Cultivars 
Several cultivars are grown for ornamental purposes in parks and large gardens, of which 'Aurea', 'Beuvronensis', 'Frensham', and 'Gold Coin' have gained the Royal Horticultural Society's Award of Garden Merit.

In culture 
The Scots pine is the plant badge of Clan Gregor. It is the national tree of Scotland.

Gallery

See also 
 Pinus × rhaetica

References

External links 

Pinus sylvestris - distribution map, genetic conservation units and related resources. European Forest Genetic Resources Programme (EUFORGEN)

sylvestris
Flora of Europe
Flora of temperate Asia
Forests and woodlands of Scotland
Trees of Asia
Trees of Europe
Trees of Russia
Trees of continental subarctic climate
Trees of humid continental climate
Trees of mild maritime climate
Trees of subpolar oceanic climate
Plants described in 1753
Least concern plants
Least concern biota of Asia
Least concern biota of Europe
Garden plants of Asia
Garden plants of Europe
Ornamental trees
Taxa named by Carl Linnaeus